Bettina Bedwell (January 13, 1889 – April 29, 1947) was an American journalist and fashion illustrator. She reported on fashion from Paris throughout the 1920s and 30s.

Early life and education 
Bettina Bedwell was born in Broken Bow, Nebraska on January 13, 1889. Her parents were Walter C. and Emma Moore Bedwell. She attended school in Denver and then studied at the Art Institute of Chicago.

Mid-life and career 

Bedwell moved to Paris in 1921 or 1922. In 1924, she began reporting on fashion for the Chicago Tribune-New York News Syndicate. That year she also married Abraham Rattner, an American painter, in Paris.: 268 

In 1929, American author Kay Boyle began working for Bedwell as a "secretary." Boyle wrote to her family that the work included writing fashion articles for the Chicago Tribune, which appeared under Bedwell's name. Boyle and Bedwell became friends, continuing to work together and visit each other into the 1940s.: 164-5 

From 1929 until 1940, Bedwell was a "style spy" for Margaret Hayden Rorke of the Textile Color Card Association of the United States. Bedwell wrote weekly letters to Rorke, reporting on the color trends she saw on the streets, in restaurants, and in the couture houses of Paris. Her letters were often full of swatches and color samples. Rorke used Bedwell's letters and swatches to enhance her own color forecasting in the U.S.

Bedwell understood the pirating of Paris fashions well. She had reported on fashion bootlegging and "style pirates" in a 1930 article that appeared in the New York Times. Bedwell's own columns were sometimes accompanied by sewing patterns that copied the Parisian styles she reported on. Bedwell later put this knowledge to use in outlining a novel, Yellow Dusk (Hurst & Blackett, 1937), a thriller about drug smuggling and fashion theft set in a Paris couture house. The novel appeared under Bedwell's name, but it was ghostwritten from her outline by Kay Boyle, who was paid $250.

Later life and death 
Bedwell and Rattner left Paris in late 1939 to avoid the Nazi invasion. They settled in New York. Bettina Bedwell died there from a kidney infection on April 29, 1947.

References 

American women journalists
1889 births
1947 deaths
School of the Art Institute of Chicago alumni
People from Broken Bow, Nebraska
Fashion illustrators
Journalists from Nebraska